As Máscaras (English: The Masks) is the second solo album and first studio album by the Brazilian recording artist Claudia Leitte, released on May 23, 2010. The album was nominated to Latin Grammy Award for Best Brazilian Contemporary Pop Album.

Track listing

Charts

Weekly charts

Awards and nominations 
List of awards and nominations for the album and singles.

Release history

References 

2010 albums
Claudia Leitte albums